The 2010 CHIO Aachen was the 2010 edition of the CHIO Aachen, the German official horse show in five horse sport disciplines (show jumping, dressage, eventing, four-in-hand-driving and vaulting).

The CHIO Aachen is in show jumping and dressage the most prestigious horse show in Europe. It is also called "Weltfest der Pferdesports" (World Equestrian Festival).

The competitions are held at different places in Aachen. The show jumping competitions are held in the "Hauptstadion" of the CHIO Aachen, the dressage event are held in the "Deutsche Bank Stadion" and the vaulting competitions are held in the "Albert-Vahle-Halle", all in Aachen.

The 2010 CHIO Aachen was held as CSIO 5* (show jumping), CDIO 5* (dressage), CICO 3* (eventing), CAIO (four-in-hand-driving) and CVIO 2* (vaulting). It was held between July 9, 2010 and July 11, 2010 (vaulting) and between July 13, 2010 and July 18, 2010 (other disciplines).

The first horse show were held 1924 in Aachen, together with a horse race. In 1927 the horse show lasted six days. The first show jumping nations cup was held here in 1929. Since 2007, influenced by the World Equestrian Games 2006 in Aachen, also eventing and vaulting are disciplines of the CHIO Aachen. In 2010 the 79th time a horse show is held in the Soers in Aachen.

Nations Cup of Germany (vaulting) 
The 2010 vaulting Nations Cup of Germany was part of the 2010 CHIO Aachen. It was a combined competition of three Freestyle vaulting competitions (single vaulting - Men, single vaulting - Women and team vaulting. Unlike the other disciplines nations can start with more than one team.

[Top 4 of 8 teams]

FEI Nations Cup of Germany (show jumping) 
The 2010 FEI Nations Cup of Germany (show jumping) was part of the 2010 CHIO Aachen. It was the sixth competition of the 2010 Meydan FEI Nations Cup.

The 2010 FEI Nations Cup of Germany was held at Thursday, July 15, 2010 at 7:30 pm (second round under floodlight). The competing teams were: France, the United States of America, Germany, Switzerland, the Netherlands, Ireland, Sweden, Great Britain, Spain and Poland.

The competition was a show jumping competition with two rounds and optionally one jump-off. The height of the fences were up to 1.60 meters. Eight of ten teams were allowed to start in the second round.

The competition was endowed with 200,000 €. Mercedes-Benz was the sponsor of this competition.

(grey penalties points do not count for the team result)

CICO 3* 
The CICO 3*, was the official eventing competition of Germany. It was held as two-day-event. The first part of this competition, the dressage phase, was held at Friday, July 16, 2010 at 8:30 am. The second phase, the show jumping phase, was held at Friday, July 16, 2010 at 5:30 pm. The final phase, the cross country phase, was held at Saturday, July 17, 2010 at 10:30 am.

The sponsor of this competition was the DHL.

team result 

(grey penalties points do not count for the team result)

Individual result 

(Top 5 of 41 Competitors)

Grand Prix Spécial 
The Grand Prix Spécial was one of the most important dressage competitions at the 2010 CHIO Aachen. A Grand Prix Spécial is the competition with the highest definite level of dressage competitions.

It was held at Saturday, July 17, 2010 at 9:00 am. The Meggle AG was the sponsor of this competition.

(top 5 of 30 competitors)

Nations Cup of Germany (dressage) 
The 2010 dressage Nations Cup of Germany was part of the 2010 CHIO Aachen. The result of the dressage Nations Cup was an addition of the result of the Grand Prix de Dressage and the Grand Prix Spécial of four team riders per team.

The sponsor of this competition was the Lambertz-Group.

Nations Cup of Germany (four-in-hand-driving) 
The four-in-hand-driving nations cup is the official four-in-hand-driving competition of Germany.

The first part of this competition, the driven dressage driving, will be held at Thursday, May 15, 2010 at 10:30 am. The second competition, the obstacle cone driving, will be held at Friday, July 16, 2010 at 9:00 pm. The final phase, the marathon, will be held at Saturday, July 17, 2010 at 2:25 pm.

team result 

(grey penalties points do not count for the team result)

individual result 

(top 10 of 24 competitors)

Best of Champions 
The "Best of Champions" was a special show jumping competition. The current Olympic champion, winner of World Equestrian Games, the current European champion and the last year winner of the Show jumping grand prix of Aachen have the right to start in this competition.

The competition was a show jumping competition with horse change. Each rider start in the first round with his own horse, in the second, third and in the fourth round with the horses of the other competitors. If a jump-off is necessary, each rider start again with his own horse.

It was held at Saturday, July 17, 2010 at 7:00 pm.

Horse Ranking
 1.) Atlete van't Heike and Upsilon d´Ocquier - each 4 penalties
 3.) Brazil-M - 12 penalties
 4.) Calimero van't Roth - 16 penalties

Grand Prix Freestyle 
The Grand Prix Freestyle (or Grand Prix Kür), also called the "Großer Dressurpreis von Aachen" (Grand dressage price of Aachen) was the final competition of the CDIO 5* at the 2010 CHIO Aachen.

A Grand Prix Freestyle is a Freestyle dressage competition. The level of this competition is at least the level of a Grand Prix de Dressage, but it can be higher than the level of a Grand Prix Spécial.

The Grand Prix Freestyle at the CDIO 5* (2010 CHIO Aachen) was held at Sunday, July 18, 2010 at 10:00 am. The Deutsche Bank was the sponsor of this competition.

Großer Preis von Aachen 
The "Großer Preis von Aachen", the show jumping grand prix of Aachen, was the mayor show jumping competition of the 2010 CHIO Aachen. It was held at Sunday, July 18, 2010 at 3:00 pm. The competition was a show jumping competition with two round and one jump-off, the height of the fences were up to 1.60 meters.

The main sponsor of the "Großer Preis von Aachen" is Rolex. The Grand Prix will be endowed with 350,000 €.

(Top 5 of 40 Competitors)

Television / live video
The German TV stations (WDR, ARD, ZDF and Phoenix) broadcast more than 20 hours from the 2010 CHIO Aachen, most of them live. Across Europe Eurosport broadcast a two-hour summary programme of the 2010 CHIO Aachen (Show jumping nations cup and show jumping grand prix).

Most of the competition are streamed live by the German website clipmyhorse.de (not marathon driving, cross county phase of eventing and show jumping nations cup, weblink see external links).

References

External links
 Official website
 2010 results: vaulting, other disciplines
 Live stream of many competitions

2010 in show jumping
CHIO Aachen